Stalowa Wola-Rozwadów is a rail junction of the Polish State Railways, located in Rozwadów, one of districts of southern Polish city of Stalowa Wola. The station was built in 1887, along the strategic line from Przeworsk to Sobów near Sandomierz, which followed along the northern border of former Austrian province of Galicia. Currently, trains leave it in three directions - south (towards Przeworsk), west (towards Sandomierz) and north (towards Lublin). The station has three platforms.

See also 
 Stalowa Wola railway station
 Stalowa Wola Centrum railway station
 Stalowa Wola Południe railway station

External links
 Photo gallery of the station

Railway stations in Poland opened in 1887
Railway stations in Podkarpackie Voivodeship
Stalowa Wola County
Railway stations served by Przewozy Regionalne InterRegio
1887 establishments in Austria-Hungary